Brownfield is an unincorporated community in Pope County, Illinois, United States. Brownfield once had a post office, which closed on July 27, 1991.

References

Unincorporated communities in Pope County, Illinois
Unincorporated communities in Illinois